Nina Weckström (born 10 August 1979) is a Finnish badminton player from Helsingfors badminton klub. She won the National Championships in the women's doubles event seven times from 1999 to 2004 and 2006 partnered with Anu Weckström. In the international tournament, she won the women's singles title at the Southern Pan Am International in Miami, United States, and also the women's doubles event at the Norwegian International tournament with her sister Anu. After finishing her career in badminton, she received the scholarship by the URA Foundation. She educated Pedagogy in Copenhagen, and while she studying, she trained at the Holte Badmintonklub.

Achievements

BWF International Challenge/Series 
Women's singles

Women's doubles

  BWF International Challenge tournament
  BWF International Series tournament

References

External links 
 

1979 births
Living people
Finnish female badminton players